The 2000 Liège–Bastogne–Liège was the 86th edition of the Liège–Bastogne–Liège cycle race and was held on 16 April 2000. The race started in Liège and finished in Ans. The race was won by Paolo Bettini of the Mapei team.

General classification

References

2000
2000 in Belgian sport
Liege-Bastogne-Liege
April 2000 sports events in Europe